Gurgis Shlaymun is the former Deputy Governor of Iraq's Dahuk province in Iraqi Kurdistan. In April 2014, KRI held provincial elections and a new provincial council was elected and his term has finished. According to a news report in August 2006, Dahuk authorities, to include Deputy Governor Shlaymun's office, failed to investigate reports of Kurdish sabotage of Assyrian farms. He is ethnically Assyrian.

References

Changes in Iraq herald despair – or hope? 19 January 2008 
Middle Eastern Affairs Expert from Baylor University Discusses Status of 'Kurdistan of Iraq' 22 February 2007
A Saudi Company to Build 3500 Houses in Duhok 4 February 2007
Iraqi Christians Debate Self-Autonomy to Halt Exodus 2 January 2007
Assyrian Shepherd Killed By KDP Member in North Iraq 28 August 2006
ASSYRIANS IN IRAQ 2006
Assyrian Elected as Deputy Governor of Dohuk 6 April 2005
KRG statement regarding the situation of the Christian minority in Iraqi Kurdistan 16 March 2005
Email from Monday 31st of January 2005 about the result of the ELECTION in Iraq 31 January 2005
Debate at the House of Commons regarding Iraqi Kurdistan

Dohuk Governorate
Iraqi Assyrian politicians
Kurdistan Democratic Party politicians
Living people
Iraqi Assyrian people
Year of birth missing (living people)